Bactrododema is a genus of the stick insect family Diapheromeridae. Species of this genus have a relictual distribution and are endemic to southern Africa.

Species
 Bactrododema aestuans (Westwood, 1859) 
 Bactrododema alldridgei (Kirby, 1905) 
 Bactrododema bayeri (Schouteden, 1917) 
 Bactrododema centaurum (Westwood, 1859) 
 Bactrododema episcopalis (Kirby, 1896) 
 Bactrododema hecticum (Lichtenstein, 1796) 
 Bactrododema hippotaurum (Karsch, 1896) 
 Bactrododema krugeri Brock, 2004 
 Bactrododema leopoldi (Schouteden, 1916) 
 Bactrododema miliaris Bolívar, 1889 
 Bactrododema minotaurus (Gerstaecker, 1883) 
 Bactrododema moirae (Kirby, 1896) 
 Bactrododema pectinicornis (Redtenbacher, 1908) 
 Bactrododema phillipsi (Kirby, 1896) 
 Bactrododema reyi (Grandidier, 1869) 
 Bactrododema tiaratum Stal, 1858 
 Bactrododema wayi Kirby, 1902 
 Bactrododema welwitschi Bolívar, 1889

References

Phasmatodea genera